Adele Berlin (born May 23, 1943 in Philadelphia) is an American biblical scholar and Hebraist. Before her retirement, she was Robert H. Smith Professor of Biblical Studies at the University of Maryland.

Berlin is best known for 1994 work Poetics and interpretation of biblical narrative. She has also written commentaries on Zephaniah, Esther, and Lamentations. A Festschrift in her honor, "Built by Wisdom, Established by Understanding": Essays in Honor of Adele Berlin, was published in 2013.

Berlin has been a Guggenheim Fellow, and President of the Society of Biblical Literature. Along with Robert Alter and Meir Sternberg, Berlin is one of the most prominent practitioners of a literary approach to the Bible. In 2004 the Jewish Book Council awarded Berlin along with co-editor Marc Zvi Brettler the scholarship category award for the Jewish Publication Society and Oxford University Press book, The Jewish Study Bible. A decade later the two editors offered its second edition.

Works
Multiple works published:-

Books

Edited by

References

External links
Articles by Adele Berlin

1943 births
American biblical scholars
American Hebraists
American women writers
Bible commentators
Female biblical scholars
Gratz College
Hebrew University of Jerusalem alumni
Living people
Old Testament scholars
University of Maryland, College Park faculty
University of Pennsylvania alumni
Writers from Philadelphia
21st-century American women
Female Bible Translators
Jewish translators of the Bible
Jewish women writers